Michael Cimarusti is an American chef at Providence, a Michelin-starred seafood restaurant in Los Angeles, California. He won the James Beard Award for Best Chef: West in 2019.

References

Living people
People from Los Angeles
Culinary Institute of America Hyde Park alumni
American chefs
American male chefs
James Beard Foundation Award winners
Year of birth missing (living people)
Chefs from Los Angeles